The Potempa Murder of 1932 was a cause célèbre during Germany's Weimar Republic and the rise of Adolf Hitler and his Nazi Party. Committed by Nazi Party members, the brutal murder cast a dark shadow over the political advance of Hitler and the Nazis at the time. Many acts of violence would follow; the Potempa Murder was an early precursor. It led then President Paul von Hindenburg to suspect that the murder was symptomatic of how the Nazi Party operated.

On the night of 9 August 1932, five uniformed Nazi Stormtroopers (Sturmabteilung) burst into the apartment of Konrad Pietrzuch, a Communist miner and trade unionist, in the Upper Silesian village of Potempa (now part of the rural community of Krupski Młyn in Poland) and beat him to death in the presence of his mother. The five murderers did nothing to disguise themselves during the attack and they were quickly arrested. After a well-publicized trial in Beuthen (now Bytom, Poland), they were found guilty of murder and sentenced to death. Hitler, along with other senior Nazis, was furious not only with the verdict but also with the sentence. While the five murderers were in jail, he sent them a telegram: “My comrades! I am bound to you in unlimited loyalty in the face of this most hideous blood sentence. You have my picture hanging in your cells. How could I forsake you? Anyone who struggles, lives, fights, and, if need be, dies for Germany has the right on his side.”

The government under Chancellor Franz von Papen, which strove for law and order amid rising political violence, had only days before passed an emergency decree authorizing the death sentence for politically motivated killings. Chancellor von Papen was not keen to see the five murderers executed soon after the crime as he feared an escalation of Nazi violence nationwide. In September 1932, the government commuted the sentences to life imprisonment, on the ground that the new decree was unknown to the defendants at the time of the murder.

The "Potempa Five" became a significant point of contention in the debates between Hitler, von Papen, and President Paul von Hindenburg over the extent of Nazi participation in the German government. On 30 January 1933, continuing political chaos led to Hitler's being appointed Chancellor. On 21 March 1934, the Nazi government introduced legislation that granted amnesty to anyone in prison who had committed a crime “for the good of the Reich during the Weimar Republic”. All five murderers were released from prison that same month.

References 
 http://www.historylearningsite.co.uk/modern-world-history-1918-to-1980/weimar-germany/the-potempa-murder-of-1932/
 http://weimar_republik.enacademic.com/615/Potempa_Murder
 http://skepticism.org/timeline/august-history/8015-sa-stormtroopers-found-guilty-murder-alleged-communist-potempa.html

See also 
 Franz von Papen

1932 in Germany
Bytom
1932 murders in Germany